Bernardo Rimarim (born 23 March 1962) is a Filipino former cyclist. He competed in two events at the 1988 Summer Olympics.

References

External links
 

1962 births
Living people
Filipino male cyclists
Olympic cyclists of the Philippines
Cyclists at the 1988 Summer Olympics
Place of birth missing (living people)
Asian Games medalists in cycling
Asian Games bronze medalists for the Philippines
Cyclists at the 1986 Asian Games
Medalists at the 1986 Asian Games